Entre Colegas is an album by Andy González. It earned González a Grammy Award nomination for Best Latin Jazz Album.

References

2016 albums
Latin jazz albums by American artists